Associazione Calcio Sansovino is an Italian association football club, based in Monte San Savino, Tuscany. Sansovino currently plays in Eccellenza.

History

Foundation 
The club was founded in 1929.

From Serie C2 to Serie D 
From the 2003–04 to the 2007–08 season, the club has played five seasons in Serie C2.

Sansovino, in the 2010–11 Eccellenza season was promoted in Serie D from Eccellenza Tuscany group B, after winning the play-off; but in the next season it was immediately relegated again to Eccellenza.

Colors and badge 
The team's colors are orange and blue.

Honours
 Coppa Italia Serie D
 Winners: 2002–03

References

External links
Official site

Football clubs in Tuscany
Association football clubs established in 1929
Serie C clubs
1929 establishments in Italy
Monte San Savino